Amy Hayes may refer to:

 Amy Beth Hayes (born 1982), British actress
 Amy Hayes (announcer) (born 1973), American ring announcer